The 2015–16 Oklahoma State Cowgirls basketball team will represent Oklahoma State University in the 2015–16 college basketball season. It will be head coach Jim Littell's fifth season at Oklahoma State. The Cowgirls are members of the Big 12 Conference and will play their home games at the Gallagher-Iba Arena. They finished the season 21–10, 11–7 in Big 12 play to finish in a tie for fourth place. They lost in the quarterfinals of the Big 12 women's tournament to Oklahoma. They received at-large bid of the NCAA women's basketball tournament where they lost in the first round to St. Bonaventure.

Roster

Schedule and results

|-
! colspan=9 style="background:#000000; color:#FF6600;"|Exhibition

|-
!colspan=9 style="background:#000000; color:#FF6600;"| Non-conference regular season

|-
!colspan=9 style="background:#000000; color:#FF6600;"| Conference regular season

|-
!colspan=12 style="background:#000000; color:#FF6600;"| Big 12 Women's Tournament

|-
!colspan=12 style="background:#000000; color:#FF6600;"| NCAA Women's Tournament

Rankings
2015–16 NCAA Division I women's basketball rankings

See also
2015–16 Oklahoma State Cowboys basketball team

References

Oklahoma State Cowgirls basketball seasons
Oklahoma State
Oklahoma State
2015 in sports in Oklahoma
2016 in sports in Oklahoma